Vilhelm Lauritzen Architects (VLA) is an architectural firm based in Copenhagen, Denmark. It was founded by Vilhelm Lauritzen, who headed the firm from its foundation in 1922 until 1969.

Recent projects

Completed
 Daells Varehus, Copenhagen (1933)
 Radiohuset, Frederiksberg (1936)
 Folkets Hus, Copenhagen (1953 )
 TV-Byen, Gladsaxe (1964)
 Terminal 3, Copenhagen Airport, Copenhagen (1995)
 DR Byen, Ørestad,  Copenhagen (2001)
 Waterfront Shopping, Hellerup (2007)
 Stævnen, Ørestad, Copenhagen (2009)
 Fælledklubhuset, Copenhagen (2011)
 Krøyers Plads, Copenhagen (2016)

In progress
 TV-SYD, Kolding, Denmark
 Niels Bohr Science Park, Copenhagen (competition win 2010)
 Carlsberg, Plot 8, Carlsberg, Copenhagen
 Danish embassy, New Delhi, India (competition win 2011)
 Nissan harbourfront development, Halmstad, Sweden (competition win 2012)
 Residential development, Rostock, Germany (with Wuttke & Ringhof, competition win 2012)
 European School, Carlsberg, Copenhagen, Denmark

Awards
 2015 MIPIM Award (Residential Development category) for Krøyers Plads
 2015 MIPIM Award (Future Mega Project category) for North Zealand Hospital

Gallery

References

External links
 Official Vilhelm Lauritzen Architects website
 Arkitekturbilleder.dk: Projects images 

Architecture firms of Denmark
Architecture firms based in Copenhagen
Danish companies established in 1922
Design companies established in 1922
Companies based in Copenhagen Municipality